Texas Medical Center Transit Center station is a METRORail light rail station in Houston, Texas. It serves the Red Line. The station is located within the Texas Medical Center and is located at the intersection of Fannin Street and Pressler Street. A pedestrian overpass connects the light rail platforms with platforms for buses.

Routes that go through the TMC Transit Center include:
 METRO Red Line
 2 – Bellaire
 4 – Beechnut
 10 – Willowbend
 14 – Hiram Clarke
 27 – Shepherd
 28 – OST–Wayside
 41 – Kirby/Polk
 56 – Airline/Montrose
 60 – Cambridge
 68 – Braeswood
 84 – Buffalo Speedway
 87 – Sunnyside
 170 – Missouri City Express
 291/292/297/298 – Texas Medical Center Corridor
 291 – Conroe Park & Ride
 292 – West Bellfort/Westwood–Texas Medical Center Park & Ride
 297 – South Point/Monroe Park & Ride
 298 – Addicks/Northwest Transit Center –Texas Medical Center Park & Ride
 402 – Quickline Bellaire

In 2011 Kirksey Architecture announced that it plans to build a  complex on top of the existing TMC Transit Center.

Gallery

References

External links

 TMC Transit Center

METRORail stations
Railway stations in the United States opened in 2004
2004 establishments in Texas
Texas Medical Center
Railway stations in Harris County, Texas